The Family Circle was a Canadian documentary television series which aired on CBC Television in 1957.

Premise
This series concerned the lives of children, using productions from Crawley Films, the National Film Board of Canada and United World Films. Polly MacKay-Smith hosted the films which were accompanied by a panel discussion involving teachers and parents.

Scheduling
This half-hour series was broadcast on Sundays at 3:00 p.m. (Eastern) from 7 April to 9 June 1957.

Episodes

 7 April 1957: this episode argues the emotional requirements of children as they develop
 14 April 1957: this episode featured the development patterns and playing behaviour of children 15 and under
 21 April 1957: "The Terrible Twos and Trusting Threes" (Crawley Films)
 28 April 1957: "The Frustrating Fours and Fascinating Fives" (Crawley Films)
 5 May 1957: "From Sociable Six to Noisy Nines" (Crawley Films)
 12 May 1957: "Why Won't Tommy Eat?" (Crawley Films)
 19 May 1957: "From Ten To Twelve" (Crawley Films)
 26 May 1957: "The Teens" (Crawley Films)
 2 June 1957: "Shyness" (NFB)
 9 June 1957: "Family Circles" - this episode features the relationship between school and home and its effect on child development

References

External links
 

CBC Television original programming
1957 Canadian television series debuts
1957 Canadian television series endings
1950s Canadian documentary television series
1950s Canadian television talk shows
Black-and-white Canadian television shows